Ilanga illustris is a species of very small sea snail, a marine gastropod mollusk in the family Solariellidae.

Description
The height of the shell attains 6.4 mm, its diameter 9.1 mm.

Distribution
This marine species occurs in the Red Sea at depths between 212 m and 700 m.

References

 Dekker, H. & Orlin, Z. (2000). Checklist of Red Sea Mollusca. Spirula. 47 Supplement : 1-46

External links
 Photo of Ilanga illustris

illustris
Gastropods described in 1904